This is a list of notable past and present residents of Orange County.

Athletics 

 Amanda Beard, Olympic swimmer
 Shane Bieber, baseball player
 Kobe Bryant, NBA player (born in Pennsylvania)
 Gary Carter, MLB player, member of Hall of Fame
 Michael Chang, professional tennis player (born in New Jersey)
 Sasha Cohen, figure skater
 Allen Craig, baseball player
 Isaac Curtis, professional football player
 Lindsay Davenport, professional tennis player
 Phil Dent, professional tennis player
 Taylor Dent, professional tennis player
 Super Dragon, professional wrestler
 Janet Evans, swimmer
 Jim Fassel, professional football coach
 Julie Foudy, soccer player
 Matthew Hoppe, professional soccer player
 Phil Hughes, baseball player
 Nyjah Huston, professional skateboarder
 Kevin Jepsen, baseball player
 Samoa Joe, multi-time world heavyweight professional wrestling champion
 Magic Johnson, former NBA player
 Stanley Johnson, NBA Player
 Jürgen Klinsmann, player and coach for Germany's national football (soccer) team
 Mark Kotsay, baseball player
 Iris Kyle, 10-time overall Ms. Olympia professional bodybuilder
 Tommy Lasorda, Hall of Fame manager of Los Angeles Dodgers (born in Pennsylvania)
 Adam LaRoche, Washington Nationals first baseman
 Jason Lee, professional skateboarder and actor
 Mark McGwire, baseball player and coach
 Tito Ortiz, mixed martial arts fighter
 Carson Palmer, professional football player
 Aaron Peirsol, swimmer
 Dennis Rodman, basketball player (born in New Jersey)
 Elizabeth Ryan, tennis player
 Mark Sanchez, USC and NFL quarterback
 Monte Scheinblum, 1992 U.S. National Long Driving Champion
 Larry Sherry, baseball pitcher, 1959 World Series MVP
 Ed Templeton, professional skateboarder and manufacturer
 Garry Templeton, professional baseball player
 Matt Treanor, baseball player
 Peter Vidmar, gymnast
 C. J. Wilson, baseball player
 Tiger Woods, professional golfer
 Sara Ramirez, gymnast
 Kalia Pang, roller derby player
 Anthony Aiesi, soccer player
 Chase McQuown, professional skateboarder

Business 

 George Argyros, diplomat, real estate investor
 Jonas Bevacqua, co-founder of Lifted Research Group
 Donald Bren, chairman of the Irvine Company
 Dan Caldwell, co-founder of Tapout
 Christopher Cox, U.S. Securities and Exchange Commission chairman
 Mark Cuban, businessman, investor, owner of the Dallas Mavericks
 Walt Disney, creator of Disneyland theme park (born in Illinois)
 Lucy Dunn, CEO of Orange County Business Council
 Scott Fox (author), best selling entrepreneurship author
 Ray Grainger, founder of Mavenlink
 Justin Hartfield, co-founder of Weedmaps
 Reza Jahangiri, CEO of American Advisors Group
 James Jannard, businessman, designer and founder of Oakley Inc. 
 Paul Merage, co-founder of Chef America Inc.
 Arturo Moreno, businessman
 Michael Morhaime, businessman, co-founder of Blizzard Entertainment
 Henry Nicholas, CEO of Broadcom Corporation
 Igor Olenicoff, real estate developer
 Dan Rodrigues, founder of Kareo
 Rodney Sacks, businessman, chairman, and CEO of Monster Beverage
 Henry Samueli, owner of the Anaheim Ducks
 Hilton Schlosberg, businessman
 Henry Segerstrom, entrepreneur
 Vinny Smith, founder of Toba Capital
 Lynsi Snyder, owner of In-N-Out Burger
 Chad Steelberg, businessman
 David Sun, founder of Kingston Technology
 Dean Stoecker, CEO of Alteryx
 William Wang, founder and CEO of Vizio

Literature 

 Gregory Benford, science fiction author and astrophysicist
 Cornelia ten Boom, Holocaust survivor, author, lecturer
 James P. Blaylock, fantasy author
 Philip K. Dick, author and futurist (born in Illinois)
 Jeremy Gable, playwright
 Dean Koontz, horror author (born in Pennsylvania)
 Toni Turner, author

Movies, television and media 

 Scott Aukerman, comedian, writer
 Gene Autry, singer-actor, longtime owner of Angels baseball team (born in Texas)
 Tara Lynne Barr, actress
 Jimmy Bennett, actor
 Nate Berkus, designer and TV personality
 Joey Bishop, comedian and actor (born in Pennsylvania)
 Marlon Brando, film and stage actor (born in Nebraska)
 James Cameron, film director (born in Canada)
 Marc Cherry, creator and executive producer of Desperate Housewives
 Lauren Conrad, TV personality (The Hills)
 Kevin Costner, actor, director
 Valorie Curry, actress
 Heather Dubrow, actress and TV personality on The Real Housewives of Orange County (born in New York)
 Terry Dubrow, plastic surgeon and star of Botched (born in Los Angeles)
 Kyle Echarri, Filipino actor
 Susan Egan, actress, singer
 Will Ferrell, comedian and actor
 Jere Fields, actress
 Yasmeen Fletcher, actress and musician
 Cuba Gooding Jr, actor
 Vicki Gunvalson, TV personality The Real Housewives of Orange County (born in Chicago)
 Diane Keaton, actress and author (born in Los Angeles)
 Jeana Keough, TV personality on The Real Housewives of Orange County (born in Milwaukee)
 Devinn Lane, porn star
 Penny Marshall, actress and director (born in New York)
 Steve Martin, comedian, actor, author, musician (born in Texas)
 Jennette McCurdy, actress and singer
 Scott McGehee, filmmaker
 Tarek El Moussa, TV personality (Flip or Flop)
 Donny Osmond, singer and actor (born in Utah)
 Michelle Pfeiffer, actress
 Jessica Rey, actress
 Shelby Rabara, actress
 Mark Rober, mechanical-engineer, YouTube personality
 Jim Rome, sports radio personality
 Mirela Rupic, costume designer
 Keri Russell, actress
 Emily Skinner, actress
 Jeffree Star, internet celebrity
 Kristy Swanson, actress
 Milo Ventimiglia, actor
 John Wayne, iconic film actor; Orange County airport named for him (born in Iowa)

Music 

 Avenged Sevenfold, rock band
 Aloe Blacc, singer
 Jackson Browne, musician
 Jeff Buckley, singer, songwriter, musician
 Pamela Courson, wife of Doors frontman Jim Morrison
 Dick Dale, musician
 Leo Fender, inventor of the solid-body electric guitar
 Bobby Hatfield, singer, The Righteous Brothers (born in Wisconsin)
 Banks, singer
 Dexter Holland, musician and singer (The Offspring)
 Kiev, indie rock band
 Lee Soon-kyu (English name: Susan Soonkyu Lee), singer and member of Girls' Generation
 Crystal Lewis, Christian singer
 Mike Ness, pioneer in O.C. punk music (Social Distortion)
 Terri Nunn, singer, actress
 Dan O'Mahony, singer, author, activist, journalist
 Gabe Rosales, guitarist, bassist, and rapper
 Gwen Stefani, lead singer of No Doubt
 Jeff Timmons, founder, singer and producer of 98 Degrees
 Lisa Tucker, singer
 Brian Tyler, composer, conductor, arranger and producer
 Scott Weiland, lead singer of Stone Temple Pilots and Velvet Revolver
 Noah Urrea, singer, actor and member of Now United

 Yeat, rapper

Politics 

 Sean Faircloth, executive director of Secular Coalition for America, former Majority Whip of Maine House
 Jim Gilchrist, politician
 Richard Nixon, Vice President and 37th President of the United States
 Marian Elaine Walters, politician

Miscellaneous 

 Farzad Bonyadi, professional poker player
 Dominic Brooklier, former boss of the Los Angeles crime family
 Michael Carona, sheriff
 Paul Frank, clothes designer
 Adam Yahiye Gadahn, spokesman for Al Qaeda, first American charged with treason since 1952
 Maharaja Sir Yeshwant Rao Holkar II, ruler of Indore from 1926 to 1961 (lived in Santa Ana from 1938–9). 
 Usha Devi Maharani Sahiba Holkar XV Bahadur, current ruler of Indore since 1961 (grew up in Santa Ana)
 Sean McMahon, aerospace engineer
 Glenn L. Martin, aviation pioneer
 Alex Odeh, murdered Arab-American activist
 Lee Harvey Oswald, assassin of John F. Kennedy (stationed at Marine Corps Air Station El Toro in 1957 and 1958-9)
 Robert Schuller, clergyman, ministry based in Garden Grove (born in Iowa)
 Miranda Weese, ballet dancer

References

 
Orange County